Émile Jonas (5 March 1827 – 21 May 1905) was a 19th-century French composer.

Works 
1855: Le Duel de Benjamin, libretto by Eugène Mestépès
1856: La Parade, libretto by Jules Barbier and Jules Brésil)
1857: Le roi boit, libretto by Adolphe Jaime and Eugène Mestépès
1857: Les Petits Prodiges, libretto by Adolphe Jaime and Etienne Tréfeu
1863: Job et son chien, libretto by Eugène Mestépès)
1864: Le Manoir des Larenardière, libretto by Eugène Mestépès
1865: Avant la noce, libretto by Eugène Mestépès and Paul Boisselot 
1865: Les Deux Arlequins, libretto by Eugène Mestépès
1867: Marlbrough s'en va-t-en guerre, composition with Georges Bizet, Isidore Legouix and Léo Delibes, libretto by William Busnach after Paul Siraudin
1869: Le Canard à trois becs, libretto by Jules Moinaux
1869: Désiré, sire de Champigny
1871: Javotte ou , libretto by Alfred Thompson, London
1873: Goldchignon (libretto : Eugène Grangé, Victor Bernard and Étienne Tréfeu, in German Julius Hopp), Vienna
1874: , libretto by Eugène Grangé and Victor Bernard, in German, F. Zell and Richard Genée), Vienna
1882: La Bonne Aventure, libretto by Hector Crémieux and Albert de Saint-Albin
1882: Estelle et Némourin, libretto by Émile de Najac and Henry Bocage
1883: Le Premier Baiser, libretto by Émile de Najac and Raoul Toché
 La Princesse Kelebella
 Miss Robinson

References

External links 
 Émile Jona on Classical music now
 Émile Jonas on data.bnf.fr 
 

French operetta composers
Musicians from Paris
Conservatoire de Paris alumni
Officiers of the Légion d'honneur
Hazzans
1827 births
1905 deaths
Burials at Montparnasse Cemetery